"" is the fifty-third single by Japanese rock duo B'z. It was released on 14 June 2017 and is the only single from their twentieth album Dinosaur.

The song "Seimei" was used in a UCC Ueshima Coffee Co. Black sugar-free coffee commercial. "Still Alive" served as the main theme to TBS's A LIFE〜Itoshi Kihito〜, "Sekai wa Anata no Iro ni Naru" as the theme song to 2016 film Detective Conan: The Darkest Nightmare and to the anime itself and "Fukiarenasai" as the theme song for the 2016 film Shippu Rondo.

It debuted in number one on the weekly Oricon Singles Chart. It also reached number one on the Billboard Japan Hot 100 and the Top Singles Sales chart. It was ranked #38 at Oricon's 2017 year-end chart. The Recording Industry Association of Japan certified the single Gold for its sales of 100,000 copies.

Track listing

Certifications

References

External links 
 
 

2017 singles
2017 songs
B'z songs
Oricon Weekly number-one singles
Billboard Japan Hot 100 number-one singles